François Jules Edmond Got (1 October 1822, Lignerolles, Orne – 21 March 1901, Passy, a district in Paris) was a French stage actor, comedian, and opera librettist.

Edmond Got entered the Conservatoire in 1841, winning the second prize for comedy that year and the first in 1842. After a year of military service he made his debut at the Comédie Française on 17 July 1844, as Alexis in Les Héritiers and Mascarelles in Les Précieuses ridicules. He was immediately admitted pensionnaire, and became sociétaire in 1850. By special permission of the emperor in 1866 he played at the Odéon in Emile Augier's Contagion. His golden jubilee at the Théâtre Français was celebrated in 1894, and he made his final appearance the year after.

Got was a fine representative of the grand style of French acting, and was much admired in England as well as in Paris. He wrote two librettos for operas by Edmond Membrée (1820-1892), François Villon (1857) and L'Esclave (1874). In 1881, he was decorated with the cross of the Legion of Honour.

Notes

References

Appletons' Annual Cyclopaedia and Register of Important Events, D. Appleton and company, 1902, Got, Edmond, p. 491

1822 births
1901 deaths
French male stage actors
French opera librettists
Recipients of the Legion of Honour
People from Orne
Sociétaires of the Comédie-Française
19th-century French male actors
French male dramatists and playwrights
19th-century French dramatists and playwrights
19th-century French male writers